Joglaresa is a London-based medieval and folk band, known for their scholarly and imaginative re-creation of medieval music. Founded in 1992 by director Belinda Sykes, their music spans a range of European, Middle Eastern and North African medieval and folk genres, drawing especially on Arabic, Sephardic and Andalusian traditions. They are also notable for their innovative programming and use of improvisation.

They have been featured artists in national radio concert broadcasts on BBC Radio 3 and BBC Radio Jersey.

The name Joglaresa refers to the female troubadours of the middle ages – Sykes' vision was of a largely female band, although it was mostly male in the early years.

Members

Belinda Sykes
Singer and multi-instrumentalist Belinda Sykes (1966 – 16 November 2021) was founder and director of Joglaresa. She fell in love with the oboe at the age of six, by mistake, while listening to the cor anglais solo in the New World Symphony. She was also immersed in English folk music from a very early age, when her parents would take her to folk clubs and dances, where her father was a caller. Sykes went on to study oboe and recorder at Guildhall School of Music and Drama, obtained a Masters in Arab-Andalusian music from SOAS University of London and learned about various ethnic musical styles during field trips to Bulgaria and Hungary, and travels to Morocco, India, Syria and Spain. 

In 2004 Sykes was solo oboist playing Harrison Birtwistle's music in a production of Euripides' Bacchae at the Royal National Theatre. In 2004 Sykes also performed and recorded as part of the female ensemble Mille Fleurs. In 2008 she sang and played ney for the world premiere of Karl Jenkins' Stabat Mater. Jenkins composed the Incantation section of this piece with Sykes' voice in mind. In 2011 Sykes was appointed professor of medieval song at Trinity Laban Conservatoire of Music and Dance. In 2015 Sykes sang and acted in another production of Bakkhai, alongside Ben Wishaw at London's Almeida Theatre. In 2019, Sykes' "breathtaking" knowledge of the music and culture of Al-Andalus led to her presenting a special edition of the BBC's Early Music Show on the subject.

Sykes was diagnosed with terminal cancer in 2019. She died on 16 November 2021, at the age of 55.

Discography

References

External links
 Official website
 
 [ Joglaresa] on AllMusic
 
 

Medieval musical groups
Musical groups from London
Musical groups established in 1992